Plakhino is a rural locality (a village) in Khavrogorskoye Rural Settlement of Kholmogorsky District, Arkhangelsk Oblast, Russia. The population was 9 as of 2010.

Geography 
Plakhino is located on the Pingisha River, 135 km south of Kholmogory (the district's administrative centre) by road. Zaozero is the nearest rural locality.

References 

Rural localities in Kholmogorsky District